Nevada is a state in the Western region of the United States. It is bordered by Oregon to the northwest, Idaho to the northeast, California to the west, Arizona to the southeast, and Utah to the east. Nevada is the 7th-most extensive, the 32nd-most populous, and the 9th-least densely populated of the U.S. states. Nearly three-quarters of Nevada's people live in Clark County, which contains the Las Vegas–Paradise metropolitan area, including three of the state's four largest incorporated cities. Nevada's capital is Carson City. Las Vegas is the largest city in the state.

Nevada is officially known as the "Silver State" because of the importance of silver to its history and economy. It is also known as the "Battle Born State" because it achieved statehood during the Civil War (the words "Battle Born" also appear on its state flag); due to a presidency held by Abraham Lincoln, the Union benefited immensely from the support of newly awarded statehood by the infusion of the monetary support of nearly $400 million in silver ore generated at the time by the Comstock Lode. It is also known as the "Sagebrush State", for the native plant of the same name; and as the "Sage-hen State".  The name means "snowy" in Spanish, referring to Nevada's small overlap with the Sierra Nevada mountain range; however, the rest of Nevada is largely desert and semi-arid, much of it within the Great Basin. Areas south of the Great Basin are within the Mojave Desert, while Lake Tahoe and the Sierra Nevada lie on the western edge. About 86% of the state's land is managed by various jurisdictions of the U.S. federal government, both civilian and military.

American Indians of the Paiute, Shoshone, and Washoe tribes inhabit what is now Nevada. The first Europeans to explore the region were Spanish. They called the region Nevada (snowy) because of the snow which covered the mountains in winter, similar to the Sierra Nevada in Spain. The area formed part of Alta California's territory within the Viceroyalty of New Spain, which gained independence as Mexico in 1821. The United States annexed the area in 1848 after its victory in the Mexican–American War, and it was incorporated as part of Utah Territory in 1850. The discovery of silver at the Comstock Lode in 1859 led to a population boom that became an impetus to the creation of Nevada Territory out of western Utah Territory in 1861. Nevada became the 36th state on October 31, 1864, as the second of two states added to the Union during the Civil War (the first being West Virginia).

Nevada is known for its libertarian laws. In 1940, with a population of just over 110,000 people, Nevada was by far the least-populated state, with less than half the population of the next least-populous state, Wyoming. However, legalized gambling and lenient marriage and divorce laws transformed Nevada into a major tourist destination in the 20th century. Nevada is the only U.S. state where prostitution is legal, though it is illegal in its most populated regionsClark County (Las Vegas), Washoe County (Reno) and Carson City (which, as an independent city, is not within the boundaries of any county). The tourism industry remains Nevada's largest employer, with mining continuing as a substantial sector of the economy: Nevada is the fourth-largest producer of gold in the world. Nevada is the driest state, and over time, and influenced by climate change, droughts in Nevada have been increasing in frequency and severity, putting a further strain on Nevada's water security.

Etymology
The name "Nevada" comes from the Spanish adjective nevada , meaning "snow-covered" or “snowy”. The state takes its name from the Nevada Territory, which in turn was named for the Sierra Nevada.

Nevadans pronounce the second syllable with the "a" of "apple" while some people from outside of the state pronounce it with the "a" of "palm". State Assemblyman Harry Mortenson proposed a bill to recognize the alternative pronunciation of Nevada, though the bill was not supported by most legislators and never received a vote. The Nevadan pronunciation is the one used by the state legislature. At one time, the state's official tourism organization, TravelNevada, stylized the name of the state as "Nevăda", with a breve over the a indicating the locally preferred pronunciation, which was also available as a license plate design until 2007.

History

Native American history
Before the arrival of Europeans, the earliest inhabitants were Native American tribes including the Goshute, the Southern Paiute people, the Mohave people, and the Wašišiw (Washoe people).

Before 1861

Francisco Garcés was the first European in the area. Nevada was annexed as a part of the Spanish Empire in the northwestern territory of New Spain. Administratively, the area of Nevada was part of the Commandancy General of the Provincias Internas in the Viceroyalty of New Spain. Nevada became a part of Alta California (Upper California) province in 1804 when the Californias were split. With the Mexican War of Independence won in 1821, the province of Alta California became a territory (state) of Mexico, with a small population. Jedediah Smith entered the Las Vegas Valley in 1827, and Peter Skene Ogden traveled the Humboldt River in 1828. When the Mormons created the State of Deseret in 1847, they laid claim to all of Nevada within the Great Basin and the Colorado watershed. They also founded the first white settlement in what is now Nevada, Mormon Station (modern-day Genoa), in 1851. In June 1855, William Bringhurst and 29 fellow Mormon missionaries from Utah arrived at a site just northeast of downtown Las Vegas and built a 150-foot square adobe fort, the first permanent structure erected in the valley, which remained under the control of Salt Lake City until the winter of 1858–1859.

As a result of the Mexican–American War and the Treaty of Guadalupe Hidalgo, Mexico permanently lost Alta California in 1848. The new areas acquired by the United States continued to be administered as territories. As part of the Mexican Cession (1848) and the subsequent California Gold Rush that used Emigrant Trails through the area, the state's area evolved first as part of the Utah Territory, then the Nevada Territory (March 2, 1861; named for the Sierra Nevada).

The first discovery of a major U.S. deposit of silver ore occurred in Comstock Lode under Virginia City, Nevada, in 1859.

Separation from Utah Territory

On March 2, 1861, the Nevada Territory separated from the Utah Territory and adopted its current name, shortened from The Sierra Nevada (Spanish for "snow-covered mountain range"). The 1861 southern boundary is commemorated by Nevada Historical Markers 57 and 58 in Lincoln and Nye counties.

Statehood (1864)

Eight days before the presidential election of 1864, Nevada became the 36th state in the Union, despite lacking the minimum 60,000 residents that Congress typically required a potential state to have in order to become a state. (At the time, Nevada's population was little more than 10,000.) Governor Nye was frustrated that previous attempts to send the constitution via overland mail and by sea had failed by October 24, so on October 26 the full text was sent by telegraph at a cost of $4,303.27the most costly telegraph on file at the time for a single dispatch, . Finally, the response from Washington came on October 31, 1864: "the pain is over, the child is born, Nevada this day was admitted into the Union". Statehood was rushed to the date of October 31 to help ensure Abraham Lincoln's reelection on November8 and post-Civil War Republican dominance in Congress, as Nevada's mining-based economy tied it to the more industrialized Union. As it turned out, however, Lincoln and the Republicans won the election handily and did not need Nevada's help.

Nevada is one of only two states to significantly expand its borders after admission to the Union, with the other being Missouri, which acquired additional territory in 1837 due to the Platte Purchase. In 1866 another part of the western Utah Territory was added to Nevada in the eastern part of the state, setting the current eastern boundary. Nevada achieved its current southern boundaries on January 18, 1867, when it absorbed the portion of Pah-Ute County in the Arizona Territory west of the Colorado River, essentially all of present-day Nevada south of the 37th parallel. The transfer was prompted by the discovery of gold in the area, and officials thought Nevada would be better able to oversee the expected population boom. This area includes most of what is now Clark County and the Las Vegas metropolitan area.

Mining shaped Nevada's economy for many years (see Silver mining in Nevada). When Mark Twain lived in Nevada during the period described in Roughing It, mining had led to an industry of speculation and immense wealth. Both mining and population temporarily declined in the late 19th century. However, the rich silver strike at Tonopah in 1900, followed by strikes in Goldfield and Rhyolite, created a second mining boom in  Nevada and Nevada's population.

Gambling and labor
Unregulated gambling was commonplace in the early Nevada mining towns but was outlawed in 1909 as part of a nationwide anti-gambling crusade. Because of subsequent declines in mining output and the decline of the agricultural sector during the Great Depression, Nevada again legalized gambling on March 19, 1931, with approval from the legislature. Governor Fred B. Balzar's signature enacted the most liberal divorce laws in the country and open gambling. The reforms came just eight days after the federal government presented the $49million construction contract for Boulder Dam (now Hoover Dam).

Nuclear testing
Nuclear testing at the Nevada Test Site began with a  nuclear bomb dropped on Frenchman Flat on January 27, 1951. The last atmospheric test was conducted on July 17, 1962, and the underground testing of weapons continued until September 23, 1992. The location is known for having the highest concentration of nuclear-detonated weapons in the U.S.

Over 80% of the state's area is owned by the federal government. The primary reason for this is homesteads were not permitted in large enough sizes to be viable in the arid conditions that prevail throughout desert Nevada. Instead, early settlers would homestead land surrounding a water source, and then graze livestock on the adjacent public land, which is useless for agriculture without access to water (this pattern of ranching still prevails).

2020s 
The COVID-19 pandemic was confirmed to have reached the U.S. state of Nevada on March 5, 2020. Because of concerns about coronavirus disease 2019 (COVID-19), Nevada governor Steve Sisolak declared a state of emergency on March 12, 2020. Four days later, Nevada reported its first death. On March 17, 2020, Sisolak ordered the closure of non-essential businesses in the state, to help prevent the spread of the coronavirus. Grocery stores were among the businesses considered essential, and restaurants were allowed to provide drive-thru, takeout, and delivery services. At the end of March 2020, Sisolak announced a 90-day moratorium on evictions and foreclosures for commercial and residential tenants. The moratorium would be extended several times over the next year.

Various protests were held against Sisolak's shutdown order beginning in April 2020. Las Vegas mayor Carolyn Goodman was also critical of the shutdown and its length, urging Sisolak to reopen the state. Goodman was widely criticized after suggesting that Las Vegas become a control group to test the effectiveness of social distancing. Nevada launched the first phase of its reopening on May 9, 2020. Restaurants, retailers, outdoor malls, and hair salons were among the businesses allowed to reopen, but with precautions in place, such as limiting occupancy to 50 percent. A second phase went into effect on May 29, 2020. It allowed for the reopening of state parks and businesses such as bars, gyms, and movie theaters. Casinos began reopening on June 4, 2020.

Geography

Nevada is almost entirely within the Basin and Range Province and is broken up by many north–south mountain ranges. Most of these ranges have endorheic valleys between them.

Much of the northern part of the state is within the Great Basin, a mild desert that experiences hot temperatures in the summer and cold temperatures in the winter. Occasionally, moisture from the Arizona Monsoon will cause summer thunderstorms; Pacific storms may blanket the area with snow. The coldest recorded temperature was  set in San Jacinto in 1972, in the northeastern portion of the state.

The Humboldt River crosses the state from east to west across the northern part of the state, draining into the Humboldt Sink near Lovelock. Several rivers drain from the Sierra Nevada eastward, including the Walker, Truckee, and Carson rivers. All of these rivers are endorheic basins, ending in Walker Lake, Pyramid Lake, and the Carson Sink, respectively. However, not all of Nevada is within the Great Basin. Tributaries of the Snake River drain the far north, while the Colorado River, which also forms much of the boundary with Arizona, drains much of southern Nevada.

The mountain ranges, some of which have peaks above , harbor lush forests high above desert plains, creating sky islands for endemic species.

The southern third of the state, where the Las Vegas area is situated, is within the Mojave Desert. The area receives less rain in the winter but is closer to the Arizona Monsoon in the summer. The terrain is also lower, mostly below , creating conditions for hot summer days and cool to chilly winter nights.

The largest mountain range in the southern portion of the state is the Spring Mountain Range, just west of Las Vegas. The state's lowest point is along the Colorado River, south of Laughlin.

Nevada ranks second, after Alaska, for the greatest number of mountains in the United States, followed by California, Montana, and Washington.

Climate

Nevada is the driest state in the United States. It is made up of mostly desert and semi-arid climate regions, and, with the exception of the Las Vegas Valley, the average summer diurnal temperature range approaches  in much of the state. While winters in northern Nevada are long and fairly cold, the winter season in the southern part of the state tends to be of short duration and mild. Most parts of Nevada receive scarce precipitation during the year. The most rain that falls in the state falls on the east and northeast slopes of the Sierra Nevada.

Nevada's  reading is the third highest statewide record high temperature of a U.S. state, just behind Arizona's  reading and California's  reading.

Flora and fauna
The vegetation of Nevada is diverse and differs by state area. Nevada contains six biotic zones: alpine, sub-alpine, ponderosa pine, pinion-juniper, sagebrush and creosotebush.

Counties

Nevada is divided into political jurisdictions designated as counties. Carson City is officially a consolidated municipality, meaning it legally functions as both a city and a county.

Lake County, one of the original nine counties formed in 1861, was renamed Roop County in 1862. Part of the county became Lassen County, California, in 1864, resolving border uncertainty. In 1883, Washoe County annexed the portion that remained in Nevada.

In 1969, Ormsby County was dissolved and the Consolidated Municipality of Carson City was created by the Legislature in its place coterminous with the old boundaries of Ormsby County.

Bullfrog County was formed in 1987 from part of Nye County. After the creation was declared unconstitutional, the county was abolished in 1989.

Humboldt County was designated as a county in 1856 by Utah Territorial Legislature and again in 1861 by the new Nevada Legislature.

Clark County is the most populous county in Nevada, accounting for nearly three-quarters of its residents. Las Vegas, Nevada's most populous city, has been the county seat since the county was created in 1909 from a portion of Lincoln County, Nevada. Before that, it was a part of Arizona Territory. Clark County attracts numerous tourists: An estimated 44million people visited Clark County in 2014.

Washoe County is the second-most populous county of Nevada. Its county seat is Reno. Washoe County includes the Reno–Sparks metropolitan area.

Lyon County is the third most populous county. It was one of the nine original counties created in 1861. It was named after Nathaniel Lyon, the first Union General to be killed in the Civil War. Its current county seat is Yerington. Its first county seat was established at Dayton on November 29, 1861.

Settlements

Parks and recreation areas

Recreation areas maintained by the federal government

Northern Nevada
 California National Historic Trail
 Humboldt National Forest
 Great Basin National Park
 Old Spanish National Historic Trail
 Pony Express National Historic Trail

Southern Nevada
 Ash Meadows National Wildlife Preserve
 Bootleg Canyon Mountain Bike Park
 Toiyabe National Forest
 Inyo National Forest
 Mount Charleston and the Mount Charleston Wilderness
 Spring Mountains and the Spring Mountains National Recreation Area
 Lake Mead National Recreation Area
 Death Valley National Park
 Red Rock Canyon National Conservation Area

Wilderness

There are 68 designated wilderness areas in Nevada, protecting some  under the jurisdiction of the National Park Service, U.S. Forest Service, and Bureau of Land Management.

State parks

The Nevada state parks comprise protected areas managed by the state of Nevada, including state parks, state historic sites, and state recreation areas. There are 24 state park units, including Van Sickle Bi-State Park which opened in July 2011 and is operated in partnership with the state of California.

Demographics

Population

The United States Census Bureau determined Nevada had a population of 3,104,614 at the 2020 U.S. census. In 2022, the estimated population of Nevada was 3,177,772, an increase of 73,158 residents (2.36%) since the 2020 census. Nevada had the highest percentage growth in population from 2017 to 2018. At the 2020 census, 6.0% of the state's population were reported as under 5, 22.5% were under 18, and 16.1% were 65 or older. Females made up about 49.8% of the population.

Since the 2020 census, the population of Nevada had a natural increase of 2,374 (the net difference between 42,076 births and 39,702 deaths); and an increase due to net migration of 36,605 (of which 34,280 was due to domestic and 2,325 was due to international migration).

The center of population of Nevada is in southern Nye County. At the 2020 census, the town had 44,738 residents. Las Vegas grew from a gulch of 100 people in 1900 to 10,000 by 1950 to 100,000 by 1970, and was America's fastest-growing city and metropolitan area from 1960 to 2000.

From about the 1940s until 2003, Nevada was the fastest-growing state in the U.S. percentage-wise. Between 1990 and 2000, Nevada's population increased by 66%, while the nation's population increased by 13%. More than two-thirds of the population live in Clark County, which is coextensive with the Las Vegas metropolitan area. Thus, in terms of population, Nevada is one of the most centralized states in the nation.

Henderson and North Las Vegas are among the top 20 fastest-growing U.S. cities with populations over 100,000. Other desert towns like Indian Springs and Searchlight on the outskirts of Las Vegas have seen some growth as well.

Since 1950, the rate of population born in Nevada has never peaked above 27 percent, the lowest rate of all states. In 2012, only 25% of Nevadans were born in Nevada.

According to HUD's 2022 Annual Homeless Assessment Report, there were an estimated 7,618 homeless people in Nevada. 

According to the 2017 American Community Survey, 28.2% of Nevada's population were of Hispanic or Latino origin (of any race): Mexican (21.4%), Puerto Rican (0.9%), Cuban (1.0%), and other Hispanic or Latino origin (4.8%). The five largest non-Hispanic White ancestry groups were: German (11.3%), Irish (9.0%), English (6.9%), Italian (5.8%), and American (4.7%).

In 1980, non-Hispanic whites made up 83.3% of the state's population.

As of 2011, 63.6% of Nevada's population younger than age1 were minorities. Las Vegas is a majority-minority city. According to the United States Census Bureau estimates, as of July 1, 2018, non-Hispanic Whites made up 48.7% of Nevada's population.

In Douglas, Mineral, and Pershing counties, a plurality of residents are of Mexican ancestry. In Nye County and Humboldt County, residents are mostly of German ancestry; Washoe County has many Irish Americans. Americans of English descent form pluralities in Lincoln County, Churchill County, Lyon County, White Pine County, and Eureka County.

Asian Americans lived in the state since the California Gold Rush of the 1850s brought thousands of Chinese miners to Washoe county. They were followed by a few hundred Japanese farmworkers in the late 19th century. By the late 20th century, many immigrants from China, Japan, Korea, the Philippines, Bangladesh, India, and Vietnam came to the Las Vegas metropolitan area. The city now has one of America's most prolific Asian American communities, with a mostly Chinese and Taiwanese area known as "Chinatown" west of I-15 on Spring Mountain Road. Filipino Americans form the largest Asian American group in the state, with a population of more than 113,000. They comprise 56.5% of the Asian American population in Nevada and constitute about 4.3% of the entire state's population.

Mining booms drew many Greek and Eastern European immigrants to Nevada. In the early twentieth century, Greeks, Slavs, Danes, Japanese, Italians, and Basques poured into Nevada.

Native American tribes in Nevada are the Northern and Southern Paiute, Western Shoshone, Goshute, Hualapai, Washoe, and Ute tribes.

Whites remain the largest racial or ethnic group in Nevada. Hispanics are the fastest growing ethnic group in Nevada. There is a growing Mexican and Central American population in Nevada. Many of Nevada's Latino immigrants are from Mexico, Guatemala and El Salvador. Nevada also has a growing multiracial population.

The top countries of origin for immigrants in Nevada were Mexico (39.5 percent of immigrants), the Philippines (14.3 percent), El Salvador (5.2 percent), China (3.1 percent), and Cuba (3 percent).

The most common ancestries in Nevada include Mexican, German, Irish, English, Italian and Asian.

Nevada is the third most diverse state in the country, behind only Hawaii and California.
Birth data
Note: Births within the table do not add up, due to Hispanics being counted both by their ethnicity and by their race, giving a higher overall number.

 Since 2016, data for births of White Hispanic origin are not collected, but included in one Hispanic group; persons of Hispanic origin may be of any race.

A small percentage of Nevada's population lives in rural areas. The culture of these places differs significantly from major metropolitan areas. People in these rural counties tend to be native Nevada residents, unlike in the Las Vegas and Reno areas, where the vast majority of the population was born in another state. The rural population is also less diverse in terms of race and ethnicity. Mining plays an important role in the economies of the rural counties, with tourism being less prominent. Ranching also has a long tradition in rural Nevada.

Locations by per capita income

Religion

Church attendance in Nevada is among the lowest of all U.S. states. In a 2009 Gallup poll only 30% of Nevadans said they attended church weekly or almost weekly, compared to 42% of all Americans (only four states were found to have a lower attendance rate than Nevada's). In 2020, the Public Religion Research Institute determined 67% of the population were Christian, reflecting a 1% increase in religiosity from 2014's separate Pew study.

Major religious affiliations of the people of Nevada were, according to the Pew Research Center in 2014: Protestant 35%, Irreligious 28%, Roman Catholic 25%, Latter-day Saints 4%, Jewish 2%, Hindu less than 1%, Buddhist 0.5% and Muslim less than 0.1%. Parts of Nevada (in the eastern parts of the state) are situated in the Mormon Corridor.

The largest denominations by number of adherents in 2010 were the Roman Catholic Church with 451,070; The Church of Jesus Christ of Latter-day Saints with 175,149; and the Southern Baptist Convention with 45,535; Buddhist congregations 14,727; Baháʼí Faith 1,723; and Muslim 1,700. The Jewish community is represented by The Rohr Jewish Learning Institute and Chabad.  According to the Church of Jesus Christ of Latter-day Saints, 6.2% of Nevadans are adherents, making it the sixth highest percentage state in the Union.

Languages
The most common non-English languages spoken in Nevada are Spanish, Tagalog and Chinese. Indigenous languages of Nevada include Northern Paiute, the Southern Paiute, Shoshone, and Washo.

Economy

The economy of Nevada is tied to tourism (especially entertainment and gambling related), mining, and cattle ranching. Nevada's industrial outputs are tourism, entertainment, mining, machinery, printing and publishing, food processing, and electric equipment. The Bureau of Economic Analysis estimates Nevada's total state product in 2018 was $170billion. The state's per capita personal income in 2020 was $53,635, ranking 31st in the nation. Nevada's state debt in 2012 was calculated to be $7.5billion, or $3,100 per taxpayer. As of May 2021, the state's unemployment rate was 7.8%.

Mining

In portions of the state outside of the Las Vegas and Reno metropolitan areas mining plays a major economic role. By value, gold is by far the most important mineral mined. In 2004,  of gold worth $2.84billion were mined in Nevada, and the state accounted for 8.7% of world gold production. Silver is a distant second, with  worth $69million mined in 2004. Other minerals mined in Nevada include construction aggregates, copper, gypsum, diatomite and lithium. Despite its rich deposits, the cost of mining in Nevada is generally high, and output is very sensitive to world commodity prices.

Cattle ranching
Cattle ranching is a major economic activity in rural Nevada. Nevada's agricultural outputs are cattle, hay, alfalfa, dairy products, onions, and potatoes. As of January 1, 2006, there were an estimated 500,000 head of cattle and 70,000 head of sheep in Nevada. Most of these animals forage on rangeland in the summer, with supplemental feed in the winter. Calves are generally shipped to out-of-state feedlots in the fall to be fattened for the market. Over 90% of Nevada's  of cropland is used to grow hay, mostly alfalfa, for livestock feed. This livestock is usually used for food.

Largest employers
The largest employers in the state, as of the first fiscal quarter of 2011, are the following, according to the Nevada Department of Employment, Training and Rehabilitation:

Infrastructure

Transportation

Amtrak's California Zephyr train uses the Union Pacific's original transcontinental railroad line in daily service from Chicago to Emeryville, California, serving Elko, Winnemucca, and Reno. Las Vegas has had no passenger train service since Amtrak's Desert Wind was discontinued in 1997. Amtrak Thruway Motorcoaches provide connecting service from Las Vegas to trains at Needles, California, Los Angeles, and Bakersfield, California; and from Stateline, Nevada, to Sacramento, California. There have been a number of proposals to re-introduce service to either Los Angeles or Southern California.

The Union Pacific Railroad has some railroads in the north and south of Nevada. Greyhound Lines provide some bus service to the state.

Interstate 15 (I-15) passes through the southern tip of the state, serving Las Vegas and other communities. I-215 and I-515 also serve the Las Vegas metropolitan area. I-80 crosses through the northern part of Nevada, roughly following the path of the Humboldt River from Utah in the east and the Truckee River westward through Reno into California. It has a spur route, I-580. Nevada also is served by several U.S. highways: US6, US50, US93, US95 and US395. There are also 189 Nevada state routes. Many of Nevada's counties have a system of county routes as well, though many are not signed or paved in rural areas. Nevada is one of a few states in the U.S. that do not have a continuous interstate highway linking its two major population centersthe road connection between the Las Vegas and Reno areas is a combination of several different Interstate and U.S. highways. The Interstate 11 proposed routing may eventually remedy this.

The state is one of just a few in the country to allow semi-trailer trucks with three trailerswhat might be called a "road train" in Australia. But American versions are usually smaller, in part because they must ascend and descend some fairly steep mountain passes.

RTC Transit is the public transit system in the Las Vegas metropolitan area. The agency is the largest transit agency in the state and operates a network of bus service across the Las Vegas Valley, including the use of The Deuce, double-decker buses, on the Las Vegas Strip and several outlying routes. RTC RIDE operates a system of local transit bus service throughout the Reno-Sparks metropolitan area. Other transit systems in the state include Carson City's JAC. Most other counties in the state do not have public transportation at all.

Additionally, a  monorail system provides public transportation in the Las Vegas area. The Las Vegas Monorail line services several casino properties and the Las Vegas Convention Center on the east side of the Las Vegas Strip, running near Paradise Road, with a possible future extension to Harry Reid International Airport. Several hotels also run their own monorail lines between each other, which are typically several blocks in length.

Harry Reid International Airport in Las Vegas is the busiest airport serving Nevada. The Reno-Tahoe International Airport (formerly known as the Reno Cannon International Airport) is the other major airport in the state.

Energy

Nevada has had a thriving solar energy sector. An independent study in 2013 concluded that solar users created a $36million net benefit. However, in December 2015, the Public Utility Commission let the state's only power company, NV Energy, charge higher rates and fees to solar panel users, leading to an immediate collapse of rooftop solar panel use.

In December 1987, Congress amended the Nuclear Waste Policy Act to designate Yucca Mountain nuclear waste repository as the only site to be characterized as a permanent repository for all of the nation's highly radioactive waste.

Affordable housing 
Over the last six years, the National Low Income Housing Coalition calculates the discrepancy between available affordable housing units and renters who earn below the poverty line. In Nevada, only 15 affordable rental homes are available per 100 extremely low income (ELI) households. The shortage extends to a deficit in supply of 71,358 affordable rental homes. This is the largest discrepancy of any state. The most notable catalyst for this shortage is The Great Recession and Housing Crisis of 2007 and 2008. Since then, housing prices have increased while demand has increased, and supply has struggled to match the increase in demand. In addition to this, low-income service workers are slowly being pushed out by an influx of tech professionals. In Nevada there is essentially a standard of six-figure income to affordably rent a single-family home. Considering the average salary in Nevada, $54,842 per year, this standard is on average, unaffordable. The disproportionate cost of housing compared to average salary has led to 112,872 renters to be paying more than half of their yearly income towards housing.

The definition of an affordable home is “one that a household can obtain for 30 percent or less of its annual income”. So, there is clearly a long way to go in order to close the gap between housing prices and relative income in the state. Renters are looking for solutions to still be able to live in the state in a way that their income can support. As a result, single adults are being forced to split rent with other renters or move residences to farther outside metro areas. One solution being offered is to increase the supply of higher income positions within the state to make things more affordable. However, this would require Nevadans to retrain in new jobs or careers.

Education
Education in Nevada is achieved through public and private elementary, middle, and high schools, as well as colleges and universities.

A May 2015 educational reform law expanded school choice options to 450,000 Nevada students who are at up to 185% of the federal poverty level. Education savings accounts (ESAs) are enabled by the new law to help pay the tuition for private schools. Alternatively, families "can use funds in these accounts to also pay for textbooks and tutoring".

Approximately 86.9% of Nevada residents have attained at least a high school degree or equivalent, which is below the national average of 88.6%.

Public school districts

Public school districts in Nevada include:

 Carson City School District
 Churchill County School District
 Clark County School District, the fifth largest school district in the United States
 Douglas County School District
 Elko County School District
 Esmeralda County School District
 Eureka County School District
 Humboldt County School District
 Lander County School District
 Lincoln County School District
 Lyon County School District
 Mineral County School District
 Nye County School District
 Pershing County School District
 Storey County School District
 Washoe County School District
 White Pine County School District

Colleges and universities

 Nevada System of Higher Education
 University of Nevada, Las Vegas (UNLV)
 University of Nevada, Reno (UNR)
 Nevada State College (NSC)
 Truckee Meadows Community College (TMCC)
 Great Basin College
 College of Southern Nevada (CSN)
 Western Nevada College (WNC)
 Sierra Nevada College
 Touro University Nevada
 Roseman University of Health Sciences

Research institutes

 Desert Research Institute

The Nevada Aerospace Hall of Fame provides educational resources and promotes the aerospace and aviation history of the state.

Law and government

Government

Under the Constitution of the State of Nevada, the powers of the Nevada government are divided among three separate departments: the executive consisting of the governor of Nevada and their cabinet along with the other elected constitutional officers; the legislative consisting of the Nevada Legislature, which includes the Assembly and the Senate; and the judicial consisting of the Supreme Court of Nevada and lower courts.

The governor is the chief magistrate of Nevada, the head of the executive department of the state's government, and the commander-in-chief of the state's military forces. The current governor is Joe Lombardo, a Republican.

The Nevada Legislature is a bicameral body divided into an Assembly and Senate. Members of the Assembly serve two years, and members of the Senate serve four years. Both houses of the Nevada Legislature will be impacted by term limits starting in 2010, as senators and assemblymen/women will be limited to a maximum of twelve years in each house (by appointment or election which is a lifetime limit)a provision of the constitution which was recently upheld by the Supreme Court of Nevada in a unanimous decision. Each session of the legislature meets for a constitutionally mandated 120 days in every odd-numbered year, or longer if the governor calls a special session.

On December 18, 2018, Nevada became the first in the United States with a female majority in its legislature. Women hold nine of the 21 seats in the Nevada Senate, and 23 of the 42 seats in the Nevada Assembly.

The Supreme Court of Nevada is the state supreme court and the head of the Nevada Judiciary. Original jurisdiction is divided between the district courts (with general jurisdiction), and justice courts and municipal courts (both of limited jurisdiction). Appeals from District Courts are made directly to the Nevada Supreme Court, which under a deflective model of jurisdiction, has the discretion to send cases to the Court of Appeals for final resolution.

Incorporated towns in Nevada, known as cities, are given the authority to legislate anything not prohibited by law. A recent movement has begun to permit home rule to incorporate Nevada cities to give them more flexibility and fewer restrictions from the Legislature. Town Boards for unincorporated towns are limited local governments created by either the local county commission, or by referendum, and form a purely advisory role and in no way diminish the responsibilities of the county commission that creates them.

State agencies

 Attorney General
 Department of Business & Industry
 Department of Conservation & Natural Resources
 Consumer Health Assistance
 Controller's Office
 Department of Corrections
 Nevada Department of Cultural Affairs
 Nevada Commission on Economic Development
 Department of Education
 Nevada Secretary of State, Election Division
 Department of Employment, Training & Rehabilitation
 Gaming Control Board
 Governor's Office
 Nevada Film Office
 Department of Health and Human Services
 Department of Information Technology
 Department of Justice
 Lieutenant Governor
 Nevada Military Department
 Division of Minerals, Commission on Mineral Resources
 Department of Motor Vehicles
 Department of Personnel
 Advisory Council for Prosecuting Attorneys
 Public Employees Benefit Program
 Public Employees Retirement System
 Department of Public Safety
 Nevada Public Utilities Commission
 Department of Secretary of State
 Department of Taxation
 Commission on Tourism
 Department of Transportation
 Nevada State Treasurer
 Universities and Community Colleges of Nevada
 Nevada Office of Veterans' Services
 Western Interstate Commission for Higher Education
 Nevada Department of Wildlife

Law

In 1900, Nevada's population was the smallest of all states and was shrinking, as the difficulties of living in a "barren desert" began to outweigh the lure of silver for many early settlers. Historian Lawrence Friedman has explained what happened next:

With the advent of air conditioning for summertime use and Southern Nevada's mild winters, the fortunes of the state began to turn around, as it did for Arizona, making these two states the fastest growing in the Union.

Prostitution

Nevada is the only state where prostitution is legalin a licensed brothel in a county which has specifically voted to permit it. It is illegal in larger jurisdictions such as Clark County (which contains Las Vegas), Washoe County (which contains Reno), and the independent city of Carson City.

Divorce

Nevada's early reputation as a "divorce haven" arose from the fact that before the no-fault divorce revolution in the 1970s, divorces were difficult to obtain in the United States. Already having legalized gambling and prostitution, Nevada continued the trend of boosting its profile by adopting one of the most liberal divorce statutes in the nation. This resulted in Williams v. North Carolina (1942), in which the U.S. Supreme Court ruled North Carolina had to give "full faith and credit" to a Nevada divorce. The Court modified its decision in Williams v. North Carolina (1945), by holding a state need not recognize a Nevada divorce unless one of the parties was domiciled there at the time the divorce was granted and the forum state was entitled to make its own determination.

As of 2009, Nevada's divorce rate was above the national average.

Taxes

Nevada's tax laws are intended to draw new residents and businesses to the state. Nevada has no personal income tax or corporate income tax. Since Nevada does not collect income data it cannot share such information with the federal government, the IRS.

The state sales tax (similar to VAT or GST) in Nevada is variable depending upon the county. The statewide tax rate is 6.85%, with five counties (Elko, Esmeralda, Eureka, Humboldt, and Mineral) charging this amount. Counties may impose additional rates via voter approval or through approval of the state legislature; therefore, the applicable sales tax varies by county from 6.85% to 8.375% (Clark County). Clark County, which includes Las Vegas, imposes four separate county option taxes in addition to the statewide rate: 0.25% for flood control, 0.50% for mass transit, 0.25% for infrastructure, and 0.25% for more law enforcement. In Washoe County, which includes Reno, the sales tax rate is 7.725%, due to county option rates for flood control, the ReTRAC train trench project, and mass transit, and an additional county rate approved under the Local Government Tax Act of 1991. The minimum Nevada sales tax rate changed on July 1, 2009.

The lodging tax rate in unincorporated Clark County, which includes the Las Vegas Strip, is 12%. Within the boundaries of the cities of Las Vegas and Henderson, the lodging tax rate is 13%.

Corporations such as Apple Inc. allegedly have set up investment companies and funds in Nevada to avoid paying taxes.

Gay rights

In 2009, the Nevada Legislature passed a bill creating a domestic partnership registry which enables gay couples to enjoy the same rights as married couples. In June 2015, gay marriage became legal in Nevada due to the U.S. Supreme Court case Obergefell v. Hodges.

Incorporation

Nevada provides a friendly environment for the formation of corporations, and many (especially California) businesses have incorporated in Nevada to take advantage of the benefits of the Nevada statute. Nevada corporations offer great flexibility to the board of directors and simplify or avoid many of the rules that are cumbersome to business managers in some other states. In addition, Nevada has no franchise tax, although it does require businesses to have a license for which the business has to pay the state.

Financial institutions

Similarly, many U.S. states have usury laws limiting the amount of interest a lender can charge, but federal law allows corporations to "import" these laws from their home state. Nevada has no cap on interest rates that may be agreed to in contracts.

Alcohol and other drugs

Nevada has very liberal alcohol laws. Bars are permitted to remain open 24hours, with no "last call". Liquor stores, convenience stores and supermarkets may also sell alcohol 24hours per day and may sell beer, wine and spirits.

In 2016, Nevada voters approved Question2, which legalized the possession, transportation and cultivation of personal use amounts of marijuana for adults age 21 years and older, and authorized the creation of a regulated market for the sale of marijuana to adults age 21 years and older through state-licensed retail outlets. Nevada voters had previously approved medical marijuana in 2000, but rejected marijuana legalization in a similar referendum in 2006. Marijuana in all forms remains illegal under federal law.

Aside from cannabis legalization, non-alcohol drug laws are a notable exception to Nevada's otherwise libertarian principles. It is notable for having the harshest penalties for drug offenders in the country. Nevada remains the only state to still use mandatory minimum sentencing guidelines for possession of drugs.

The Substance Abuse and Mental Health Services Administration (SAMHSA) reported, in their Behavioral Health Barometer for Nevada, published in 2014, changes to substance abuse patterns and addiction across the southwestern state. Between 2012 and 2013, adolescents in Nevada abused illicit substances at a slightly higher percentage than nationally. 10.2 percent of Nevada's adolescents abused illicit drugs compared to 9.2 percent across the United States. Between 2009 and 2013, 11.7 percent of all adolescents in the state reported abusing illicit, intoxicating substances in the month prior to the survey; this represents 25,000 adolescents.

Smoking

Nevada voters enacted a smoking ban ("The Nevada Clean Indoor Air Act") in November 2006 which became effective on December 8, 2006. It outlaws smoking in most workplaces and public places. Smoking is permitted in bars, but only if the bar serves no food, or the bar is inside a larger casino. Smoking is also permitted in casinos, certain hotel rooms, tobacco shops, and brothels. However, some businesses do not obey this law and the government tends not to enforce it. In 2011, smoking restrictions in Nevada were relaxed for certain places which allow only people 21 or older inside.

Crime

In 2006, the crime rate in Nevada was about 24% higher than the national average rate, though crime has since decreased. Property crimes accounted for about 85% of the total crime rate in Nevada, which was 21% higher than the national rate. The remaining 20.3% were violent crimes. A complete listing of crime data in the state for 2013 can be found here:

Politics

State politics

Due to heavy growth in the southern portion of the state, there is a noticeable divide between the politics of northern and southern Nevada. Historically, northern Nevada has been very Republican. The more rural counties of the north are among the most conservative regions of the country. Carson City, the state's capital, is a Republican-leaning swing city/county. Washoe County, home to Reno, has historically been strongly Republican, but now has become more of a Democratic-leaning swing county, like the state as a whole. Clark County, home to Las Vegas, has been a stronghold for the Democratic Party since it was founded in 1909, having voted Republican only six times and once for a third-party candidate. Clark and Washoe counties have long dominated the state's politics. Between them, they cast 87% of Nevada's vote, and elect a substantial majority of the state legislature. The last Republican to carry Clark County was George H. W. Bush in 1988, and the last Republican to carry Washoe County was George W. Bush in 2004. The great majority of the state's elected officials are from either Las Vegas or Reno.

In 2014, Republican Adam Laxalt, despite losing both Clark and Washoe counties, was elected Attorney General. However, he had lost Clark County only by 5.6% and Washoe County by 1.4%, attributable to lower turnout in these counties.

National politics

Nevada has voted for the winner in nearly every presidential election from 1912 to 2020, the only exceptions being 1976 when it voted for Gerald Ford over Jimmy Carter and 2016 when the state was carried by Hillary Clinton over Donald Trump. This includes Nevada supporting Democrats John F. Kennedy and Lyndon B. Johnson in 1960 and 1964, respectively, Republican Richard Nixon in 1968 and in 1972, Republican Ronald Reagan in 1980 and in 1984, Republican George H.W. Bush in 1988, Democrat Bill Clinton in 1992 and 1996, Republican George W. Bush in 2000 and 2004, and Democrat Barack Obama winning the state in both 2008 and 2012, as well as Joe Biden in the 2020 election. This gives the state status as a political bellwether. From 1912 to 2020, Nevada has been carried by the presidential victor the most out of any state (27 of 29 elections). In 2016, Nevada lost its bellwether status briefly when it narrowly cast its votes for Hillary Clinton. Nevada regained it when Biden won in 2020. Nevada has been won by the winner of nearly every presidential election since its first in 1864, only being carried by the defeated candidate eight times since statehood, most of which were before 1900. It was one of only three states won by John F. Kennedy in the American West in the election of 1960, albeit narrowly.

Hillary Clinton narrowly defeated Trump in Nevada in 2016, winning 47.92% of votes to Trump's 45.5%.

The state's U.S. Senators are Democrats Catherine Cortez Masto and Jacky Rosen. The Governorship is held by Joe Lombardo, a Republican.

Elections

Nevada is the only U.S. state to have a none of the above option available on its ballots. Officially called None of These Candidates, the option was first added to the ballot in 1975 and is used in all statewide elections, including president, US Senate and all state constitutional positions. In the event "None of These Candidates" receives a plurality of votes in the election, the candidate with the next-highest total is elected.

In a 2020 study, Nevada was ranked as the 23rd on the "Cost of Voting Index" which is a measure of "the ease of voting across the United States".

Culture

Entertainment and tourism

Resort areas like Las Vegas, Reno, Lake Tahoe, and Laughlin attract visitors from around the nation and world. In FY08 their 266 casinos (not counting ones with annual revenue under a million dollars) brought in $12 billion in gaming revenue and another $13billion in non-gaming revenue. A review of gaming statistics can be found at Nevada gaming area.

Nevada has by far the most hotel rooms per capita in the United States. According to the American Hotel and Lodging Association, there were 187,301 rooms in 584 hotels (of 15 or more rooms). The state is ranked just below California, Texas, Florida, and New York in the total number of rooms, but those states have much larger populations. Nevada has one hotel room for every 14 residents, far above the national average of one hotel room per 67 residents.

Prostitution is legal in parts of Nevada in licensed brothels, but only counties with populations under 400,000 have the option to legalize it. Although prostitution is not a major part of the Nevada economy, employing roughly 300 women as independent contractors, it is a very visible endeavor. Of the 14 counties permitted to legalize prostitution under state law, eight have chosen to legalize brothels. State law prohibits prostitution in Clark County (which contains Las Vegas), and Washoe County (which contains Reno). However, prostitution is legal in Storey County, which is part of the Reno–Sparks metropolitan area.

Sports

The Las Vegas Valley is home to the Vegas Golden Knights of the National Hockey League who began to play in the 2017–18 NHL season at T-Mobile Arena on the Las Vegas Strip in Paradise, the Las Vegas Raiders of the National Football League who began play at Allegiant Stadium in Paradise in 2020 after moving from Oakland, California, and the Las Vegas Aces of the WNBA who began playing in 2018 at Mandalay Bay Events Center after relocating from San Antonio.

Nevada takes pride in college sports, most notably its college football. College teams in the state include the Nevada Wolf Pack (representing the University of Nevada, Reno) and the UNLV Rebels (representing the University of Nevada, Las Vegas), both in the Mountain West Conference (MW).

UNLV is most remembered for its men's basketball program, which experienced its height of supremacy in the late 1980s and early 1990s. Coached by Jerry Tarkanian, the Runnin' Rebels became one of the most elite programs in the country. In 1990, UNLV won the Men's DivisionI Championship by defeating Duke 103–73, which set tournament records for most points scored by a team and largest margin of victory in the national title game.

In 1991, UNLV finished the regular season undefeated, a feat that would not be matched in DivisionI men's basketball for more than 20 years. Forward Larry Johnson won several awards, including the Naismith Award. UNLV reached the Final Four yet again, but lost their national semifinal against Duke 79–77. The Runnin' Rebels were the Associated Press pre-season No.1 back to back (1989–90, 1990–91). North Carolina is the only other team to accomplish that (2007–08, 2008–09).

The state's involvement in major-college sports is not limited to its local schools. In the 21st century, the Las Vegas area has become a significant regional center for college basketball conference tournaments. The MW, West Coast Conference, and Western Athletic Conference all hold their men's and women's tournaments in the area, and the Pac-12 holds its men's tournament there as well. The Big Sky Conference, after decades of holding its men's and women's conference tournaments at campus sites, began holding both tournaments in Reno in 2016.

Las Vegas has hosted several professional boxing matches, most recently at the MGM Grand Garden Arena with bouts such as Mike Tyson vs. Evander Holyfield, Evander Holyfield vs. Mike Tyson II, Oscar De La Hoya vs. Floyd Mayweather and Oscar De La Hoya vs. Manny Pacquiao and at the newer T-Mobile Arena with Canelo Álvarez vs. Amir Khan.

Along with significant rises in popularity in mixed martial arts (MMA), a number of fight leagues such as the UFC have taken interest in Las Vegas as a primary event location due to the number of suitable host venues. The Mandalay Bay Events Center and MGM Grand Garden Arena are among some of the more popular venues for fighting events such as MMA and have hosted several UFC and other MMA title fights. The city has held the most UFC events with 86 events.

The state is also home to the Las Vegas Motor Speedway, which hosts NASCAR's Pennzoil 400 and South Point 400. Two venues in the immediate Las Vegas area host major annual events in rodeo. The Thomas & Mack Center, built for UNLV men's basketball, hosts the National Finals Rodeo. The PBR World Finals, operated by the bull riding-only Professional Bull Riders, was also held at the Thomas & Mack Center before moving to T-Mobile Arena in 2016.

The state is also home to famous tennis player, Andre Agassi, and current baseball superstar Bryce Harper.

List of teams

Major professional teams

Minor professional teams

Amateur teams

College teams

Military

Several United States Navy ships have been named USS Nevada in honor of the state. They include:
 Nevada (1865 screw frigate) 
 USS Nevada (BM-8)
 USS Nevada (BB-36)
 USS Nevada (SSBN-733)

Area 51 is near Groom Lake, a dry salt lake bed. The much smaller Creech Air Force Base is in Indian Springs, Nevada; Hawthorne Army Depot in Hawthorne; the Tonopah Test Range near Tonopah; and Nellis AFB in the northeast part of the Las Vegas Valley. Naval Air Station Fallon in Fallon; NSAWC, (pronounced "EN-SOCK") in western Nevada. NSAWC consolidated three Command Centers into a single Command Structure under a flag officer on July 11, 1996. The Naval Strike Warfare Center based at NAS Fallon since 1984, was joined with the Navy Fighter Weapons School (TOPGUN) and the Carrier Airborne Early Warning Weapons School, which both moved from NAS Miramar as a result of a Base Realignment and Closure decision in 1993 which transferred that installation back to the Marine Corps as MCAS Miramar. The Seahawk Weapon School was added in 1998 to provide tactical training for Navy helicopters.

These bases host a number of activities including the Joint Unmanned Aerial Systems Center of Excellence, the Naval Strike and Air Warfare Center, Nevada Test and Training Range, Red Flag, the U.S. Air Force Thunderbirds, the United States Air Force Warfare Center, the United States Air Force Weapons School, and the United States Navy Fighter Weapons School.

See also

 Index of Nevada-related articles
 Outline of Nevadaorganized list of topics about Nevada

Notes

References

External links

 
 
  Annotated list of searchable databases produced by Nevada state agencies and compiled by the Government Documents Roundtable of the American Library Association.
 State Tourism website
 Nevada State Library and Archives
 Energy Profile for Nevada
 USGS real-time, geographic, and other scientific resources of Nevada
 US Census Bureau
 1875 County Map at Texas Tech Southwest Collection
 County Maps of Nevada Full color maps. List of cities, towns and county seats
 Nevada State Facts from USDA
 Forgotten NevadaGhost Towns and Mining Camps of Nevada
 Nevada's Historical Markers
 Nevada State Seal
 
 
 Online Nevada Encyclopedia, Nevada Humanities

 
1864 establishments in Nevada
States and territories established in 1864
States of the United States
Western United States
Contiguous United States
Former Spanish colonies